Philemon Arthur and the Dung is a music group from Scania, Sweden, consisting of two members known only by their pseudonyms Philemon Arthur and the Dung.  The band formed in the early 1960s under the name The Popbeams, which they changed before the release of their first album in 1972. The duo's true identities are most likely known only to a few individuals at Silence Records, the record label that the band has worked with since 1971. Philemon Arthur and the Dung do not want their identities to be known, lest those who live in their small village find out who they are.
 
The band's music is recorded on reel-to-reel tape decks with crackling microphones and is played on untuned guitars, accordion and a home-made drum kit built of tin cans and trays, with the occasional accompaniment of household objects such as saucepans, radiators and toy instruments. The lyrics vary from utter nonsense, to profoundly whimsical observations about everyday life, to satire concerning social phenomena such as homelessness, pollution, and hunting.

Despite their outsider-persona, the band has received much notice across Sweden. Their surrealistic self-titled debut won a Swedish Grammy for the best Swedish LP of 1972, which came to the dismay of many.  

Modern Swedish bands like their fellow Scanians bob hund have been greatly inspired by Philemon Arthur and the Dung, and it was this eccentric duo who discovered and forwarded bob hund's demo tape to Silence Records. 

Their songs have been covered by several Swedish artists including bob hund, Träd, Gräs och Stenar and Dom Dummaste. Their identities have not been revealed, but Magnus Uggla's 1987 cover of "In Kommer Gösta" was credited to Mats Larsson.

Discography
Philemon Arthur and the Dung (1971)
Skisser över 1914 års badmössor (Eng. Sketches of the bathing caps of 1914) (1987) 
Musikens historia del 1 och 2 (Eng. The history of music part 1 & 2) compilation disc, (1992)
Får jag spy i ditt paraply? (Eng. May I vomit in your umbrella?) (2002)

References

External links
 Record label's website

Swedish musicians
Swedish satirists
Lo-fi music groups
Outsider musicians
Unidentified people
Silence Records artists